Hainfeld is a municipality in Südliche Weinstraße district, in Rhineland-Palatinate, western Germany.

References

External links
Official Website of Hainfeld

Municipalities in Rhineland-Palatinate